The tribe Amburaneae is one of the subdivisions of the plant family Fabaceae. It has been circumscribed to include the following genera, which used to be placed in tribes Sophoreae and Swartzieae:
 Amburana Schwacke & Taub.
 Cordyla Lour.
 Dupuya J. H. Kirkbr.
 Dussia Krug & Urb. ex Taub.
 Mildbraediodendron Harms
 Myrocarpus Allemão
 Myrospermum Jacq.
 Myroxylon L.f.
 Petaladenium Ducke
This clade does not currently have a node-based, phylogenetic definition. It also lacks a clear morphological synapomorphy, however, members of the Amburaneae, as well as species found in its sister group, Dipterygeae, are known to produce a variety of resins (balsams, coumarins, etc.).

References

External links

 
Faboideae
Fabaceae tribes